Bani Haiyyan    is a village in the Marjeyoun District in southern Lebanon.

Name
According to E. H. Palmer, the name comes from the Arab tribe of  Beni Haiyan.

History
In 1875 Victor Guérin found here about 100 Metuali inhabitants. He further noted: "All the houses are built of regular stones belonging to ancient buildings, and most of the doors have fine lintels."

In 1881, the PEF's Survey of Western Palestine  (SWP)  described it as: "A small village, built of stone, containing about fifty Metawileh, situated on the side of a hill and surrounded by figs, olives, and arable land. The water supply is from about ten rock-cut cisterns in the village and a birket near."

References

Bibliography

External links 
Bani Haiyane, Localiban
Survey of Western Palestine, Map 2:   IAA, Wikimedia commons

Populated places in Marjeyoun District
Shia Muslim communities in Lebanon